The 1994–95 Arizona State Sun Devils men's basketball team represented Arizona State University during the 1994–95 NCAA men's basketball season as member of the Pac-10 Conference. The Sun Devils played their home games at Wells Fargo Arena and were coached by Bill Frieder in his fifth year at Arizona State. The Sun Devils finished with a record for 24–9, 12–6 to finish in third place in Pac-10 play. ASU received a bid to the NCAA tournament as a #5 seed. There, they defeated Ball State and Manhattan to advance to the Sweet Sixteen. In the Sweet Sixteen, they lost to the #1 seed Kentucky, 97–73.

Roster

Schedule and results

|-
!colspan=9 style=| Regular season

|-
!colspan=9 style=| NCAA Tournament

Rankings

NBA draft

References

Arizona State Sun Devils men's basketball seasons
Arizona State
Arizonia
Arizonia
Arizona State